The following are the football (soccer) events of the year 2006 throughout the world.

Events
January 1 – Australia officially left the OFC and joined the AFC.
January 3 – Antonio Cassano left Roma and joined Real Madrid. He debuted for the merengues on January 18, in a Copa del Rey match against Real Betis, and scored his first goal just three minutes after he came in during the second half.
January 4 – Robert Maaskant returns at Dutch club RBC Roosendaal as their new coach.
January 17 – Euro 2008 qualifying group assignments announced.
February 1 – Rini Coolen resigns as manager of Dutch club FC Twente.
February 2 – South Korean club Bucheon FC moved to Jeju Island and changed their name to Jeju United FC.
February 8 – Turkey are banned from staging their six home qualifying matches for Euro 2008 in Turkey due to incidents during their 2006 World Cup qualification match against Switzerland, which finished 4–2 on November 16, 2005.
March 5 – Sydney FC are crowned Australian champions in the first season of the revamped national league (the A-League)
April 5 – Celtic win the Scottish Premier League.
April 9 – Netherlands Eredivisie: PSV Eindhoven won its second consecutive title, their nineteenth in total.
April 16 – Lyon clinch their fifth consecutive Ligue 1 title with a 1–0 victory at Paris Saint-Germain.
April 22 – Alan Shearer announces his retirement from football, three weeks earlier than planned, the cause of his early decision being a niggling knee injury.
April 29 – Chelsea win second Premiership title in a row.
April 30 – Starting the largest match fixing scandal in the history of Italian Serie A football. On May 14, Juventus clinch 29th Italian title.
May 13 – Bayern Munich win second Bundesliga title in a row.
May 14 – Anderlecht wins the Belgian First Division, their twenty-eighth in total.
May 17 – FC Barcelona beat Arsenal 2–1 in the Champions League Final.
June 3 – The 2006 FIFI Wild Cup final game, Turkish Republic of Northern Cyprus vs. Zanzibar. Turkish Republic of Northern Cyprus won the game 4–1 in a penalty shootout, winning their first title.
June 9 – The 2006 World Cup finals kick off, as Germany beat Costa Rica 4–2.
June 21 – Midfielder Philip Cocu plays his 100th international match for the Netherlands, when Holland draws with Argentina (0-0) at the 2006 FIFA World Cup.
July 9 – 2006 World Cup final game, Italy vs. France. Italy won the game 5–3 in a penalty shootout, winning their fourth title.
August 16 – CONMEBOL Copa Libertadores final game, Internacional vs. São Paulo. Internacional won the cup after the draw in 2–2 in the second game. In first game, Internacional won by 2–1.
September 14 – Recopa Sudamericana 2006 return match, Boca Juniors wins its 16th international title against São Paulo, breaking the world record on number of international club titles.

International tournaments
 2006 African Cup of Nations (January 20 – February 10)
 
 
 
 
 2006 FIFI Wild Cup (May 29 – June 3)
 
 
  Republic of St. Pauli
 
 2006 FIFA World Cup (June 9 – July 9)

National champions

UEFA nations 

: KS Elbasani
: FC Rànger's
: FC Pyunik
: Austria Wien
: FK Baku
: BATE Borisov
: RSC Anderlecht
: NK Široki Brijeg
: Levski Sofia
: Dinamo Zagreb
: Apollon Limassol
: Slovan Liberec
: Copenhagen
: Chelsea
: FC Levadia
: HB Torshavn
: Tampere United
: Lyon
: Sioni Bolnisi
: Bayern Munich
: Olympiacos
: Debrecen
: FH Hafnarfjörður
: Shelbourne
: Maccabi Haifa
: Internazionale (Juventus stripped of title)

: FC Astana
: FK Ventspils
: FC Vaduz
: FBK Kaunas
: F91 Dudelange
: FK Pobeda
: Birkirkara FC
: FC Sheriff Tiraspol
: PSV
: Linfield
: Rosenborg
: Legia Warsaw
: Porto
: Steaua București
: CSKA Moscow
: SS Murata
: Celtic
: Red Star Belgrade
: MFK Ruzomberok
: ND Gorica
: FC Barcelona
: IF Elfsborg
: FC Zürich
: Galatasaray
: Shaktar Donetsk
: Total Network Solutions

CONMEBOL nations
A = Apetura, C = Clausura

 : Boca Juniors (C), Estudiantes La Plata (A)
 : Club Bolivar (C), Wilstermann (A)
 : São Paulo
 : Colo Colo (A &C)
 : Deportivo Pasto (I), Cúcuta Deportivo (II)

 : El Nacional
 : Club Libertad
 : Alianza Lima
 : Nacional Montevideo
 : Caracas FC

CONCACAF nations
A = Apetura, C = Clausura

 : Italia Shooters (CSL) 
 : Deportivo Saprissa
 : Olimpia (C), Motagua (A)
 : C.D. FAS (A), C.D. Águila (C)
 : Waterhouse F.C.

 : Chivas de Guadalajara (A), Pachuca (C)
 : San Francisco F.C.
 : Joe Public F.C.
 : Houston Dynamo (MLS)

CAF nations

 : Cotonsport Garoua
 : ASEC Mimosas
 : Ahly Sporting Club
 : Al Ittihad Tripoli
 : Wydad Casablanca

 : Ocean Boys FC
 : Mamelodi Sundowns
 : Al-Hilal
 : Espérance

AFC nations

 : Sydney FC
 : Shandong Luneng
 : Happy Valley
 : Mahindra United
 : Persik Kediri
 : Al Zawraa
 : Esteghlal FC
 : Urawa Red Diamonds
 : Al-Ansar
 : Negeri Sembilan FA

 : Al-Sadd
 : Al-Shabab
 : SAFFC
 : Seongnam Ilhwa Chunma
 : Al-Karamah
 : Bangkok University FC
 : Al-Ahli
 : FK Pakhtakor
 : Đồng Tâm Long An

International club tournaments
FIFA Club World Cup –  Sport Club Internacional
UEFA Champions League –  FC Barcelona
UEFA Cup –  Sevilla
CONCACAF Champions' Cup –  Club América
CONMEBOL Copa Libertadores –   Sport Club Internacional
CONMEBOL Sudamericana Cup –  Pachuca
CONMEBOL Recopa Sudamericana – Boca Juniors
CAF Champions League –  Al Ahly SC
CAF Confederation Cup –  Étoile du Sahel
AFC Champions League –  Jeonbuk Hyundai Motors
AFC Cup –   Al-Faisaly
OFC Champions League –  Auckland City FC

Movies
Zidane, un portrait du 21e siècle (France)
Deutschland. Ein Sommermärchen (Germany)
Once in a Lifetime (US)

Deaths

January
January 7 – Gábor Zavadszky (31), Hungarian footballer
January 8 – Elson Becerra (27), Colombian footballer
January 8 – Gerrie Kleton (52), Dutch footballer
January 13 – Peter Rösch (75), Swiss footballer
January 14 – Mark Philo (21), English footballer

February
February 4 – Jenő Dalnoki (74), Hungarian footballer
February 8 – Ron Greenwood (84), English footballer and manager
February 9 – André Strappe (77), French footballer
February 13 – Joseph Ujlaki (76), French footballer
February 17 – Jorge Pinto Mendonça (51), Brazilian footballer
February 23 – Telmo Zarraonaindía (85), Spanish footballer
February 25 – Charlie Wayman (83), English footballer
February 27 – Ferenc Bene (61), Hungarian footballer

March
March 1 – Peter Osgood (59), English footballer
March 6 – Roman Ogaza (54), Polish footballer
March 12 – Jimmy Johnstone (61), Scottish footballer
March 13 – Roy Clarke (80), Welsh footballer
March 15 – Red Storey (88), Canadian footballer
March 26 – Ole Madsen (71), Danish footballer

April
April 16 – Georges Stuber (80), Swiss footballer
April 18 – John Lyall (66), English manager
April 21 – Telê Santana (74), Brazilian manager
April 25 – Brian Labone (66), English footballer

May
May 2 – Luigi Griffanti (89), Italian footballer
May 23 – Kazimierz Górski (85), Polish manager

June
June 9 – Shay Gibbons (77), Irish footballer
June 24 – Jean Varraud (85), French footballer and manager

July
July 21 – Bert Slater (70), Scottish footballer
July 31 – Pascal Miézan (47), Ivorian footballer

August
 August 1 – Ferenc Szusza (82), Hungarian footballer
 August 15 – Faas Wilkes (82), Dutch footballer
 August 19 – Óscar Míguez, Uruguayan striker, winner of the 1950 FIFA World Cup and Uruguay's all-time record World Cup goalscorer with eight goals. (78)
 August 20 – Oscar Miguez (78), Uruguayan footballer
 August 24 – Mokhtar Ben Nacef (80), Tunisian footballer
 August 31 – Mohamed Abdelwahab (23), Egyptian footballer

September
September 2 – Pietro Broccini (78), Italian footballer
September 4 – Giacinto Facchetti (64), Italian footballer

October
October 17 – Lieuwe Steiger (82), Dutch footballer

November
 November 3 – Alberto Spencer (68), Ecuadorian footballer
 November 4 – Sergi López Segú (39), Spanish footballer
 November 5 – Pietro Rava, Italian defender, oldest surviving winner of the 1938 FIFA World Cup.(90)
 November 17 – Ferenc Puskás (79), Hungarian footballer and manager
 November 28 – Max Merkel (87), Austrian footballer and manager

December
December 5 – Gernot Jurtin (51), Austrian footballer 
December 15 – Alessio Ferramosca and Riccardo Neri (17), Italian footballers
December 31 – Ya'akov Hodorov (79), Israeli footballer

References

 
Association football by year